Xenopathia is a genus of moths in the family Blastobasidae.

Species
Xenopathia nivea 
Xenopathia novaki (Rebel, 1891)

References

Blastobasidae genera